Prioniodinidae is an extinct family of conodonts in the order Prioniodinida.

Genera
Genera are:
 †Bryantodus
 †Camptognathus
 †Chirodella
 †Cornuramia
 †Dyminodina
 †Falodus
 †Guizhoudella
 †Gyrognathus
 †Idioprionodus
 †Kamuellerella
 †Lagovidina
 †Ligonodina
 †Metalonchodina
 †Multidentodus
 †Neoplectospathodus
 †Oulodus
 †Palmatodella
 †Pluckidina
 †Polygnathellus
 †Prioniodella
 †Prioniodina
 †Prionognathodus
 †Pristognathus
 †Scotlandia
 †Subbryantodus
 †Uncadina
 †Veghella

References 

 Novyy ranneordovikskiy rod konodontov semeystva Prioniodinidae (A new Early Ordovician conodont genus of the family Prionidinidae). SP Sergeeva, Paläontologische Zeitschrift, 1963

External links 

 Prioniodinidae at biolib.cz (retrieved 15 July 2016)

Prioniodinida
Conodont families